Eric Mitchell Berg (November 21, 1945 – April 20, 2020) was a sculptor who resided in Philadelphia.

Berg was born in Pottstown, Pennsylvania. He was educated at The Hill School and graduated in 1963. Berg majored in economics at the Wharton School of the University of Pennsylvania, and later attended Penn's graduate art program.

Background
While at the University of Pennsylvania, Berg was a member of the Zeta Chapter of Phi Sigma Delta. After graduation he taught elementary school, but returned to Penn to study art.

He completed more than 44 commissions. His works are displayed at Gardener's Cottage Gates in Rittenhouse Square, the Children's Hospital of Philadelphia, Smithsonian National Zoo, The Hill School, Everglades National Park and the California Academy of Sciences. 

Berg died on April 20, 2020 at the age of 74, of heart disease at Pennsylvania Hospital in Philadelphia.

Gallery

References

External links
 
 
 

1945 births
2020 deaths
People from Pottstown, Pennsylvania
Sculptors from Pennsylvania
University of Pennsylvania School of Design alumni
The Hill School alumni
Wharton School of the University of Pennsylvania alumni